The BMW P66 Series is a prototype four-stroke 4.0-litre naturally aspirated V8 racing engine, developed and produced by BMW Motorsport in partnership with AC Schnitzer (reassembly, arrangement, preparation, maintenance, trackside support and tune-up) for Deutsche Tourenwagen Masters. BMW P66 Series was unveiled on 18 July 2011 alongside BMW M3 DTM (E92) machine at BMW Welt in Munich, Germany. The BMW P66 Series engine lifespan was only lasted seven years and later permanently retired in 2019 and later restored in 2022 in order to supply engines for BMW M Hybrid V8 LMDh machine.

BMW P66 (2012-2016)
The BMW P66 engine generates approx. 480 bhp with the air restrictor specified in the technical regulations. BMW began development, design and construction of the NA V8 engine in November 2010. The first NA V8 engine was assembled in June 2011, with the first engine completed in late-August. Codenamed P66 it was intended to see its first race in the 2012 DTM season. It is made up of 800 different components, consisting of 3,900 individual parts. When designing the DTM drivetrain, BMW Motorsport took full advantage of the technological know-how within the BMW Group. The high-tech foundry connected to BMW Plant Landshut accounts for the large cast parts, such as the cylinder head and crankcase – just as it does in the production of the six-cylinder in-line engine for the BMW M4 Coupé. The cast parts are coated and given the necessary heat treatment within the appropriate departments in Munich. The BMW V8 for the DTM is both a sprinter and a marathon runner. It allows the BMW M3 DTM to accelerate from 0 to 100 km/h in about three seconds. Only ten engines are permitted for all eight BMWs over the course of the entire season. Therefore, reliability is a prerequisite to success.

The engine's power is transferred via a sequential six-speed sport gearbox, which is operated pneumatically using shift paddles mounted on the steering wheel. The gearbox is one of the standard components, which are used by all the DTM manufacturers. It has 11 final drive ratios, which allow the engineers and drivers to react to the respective circuit and engine characteristics when setting the car up.

The BMW P66 engine was installed in BMW M3 DTM machines from 2012 to 2013 and later BMW M4 DTM in from 2014 to  2016. The BMW P66 engine captured 24 race wins, 26 pole positions, 18 fastest laps and 3 engine manufacturer titles.

Applications
BMW M3 DTM (E92)
BMW M4 DTM

BMW P66/1 (2017-2018)
The BMW P66/1 engine was a subtle updated version of P66 engine to conform 2017 DTM engine regulations. The 2017 DTM engine regulations allow for enhancement in special intake-system areas special areas to optimise the engine's performance even more. Nonetheless, maximum longevity still represents a top priority of the DTM engines’ design. Blown engines are extremely rare in DTM and usually, the engines survive the entire season. During the course of the season, cost-intensive engine revisions aren't allowed in DTM as the sealed engines only may be subjected to services in this period of time, according to the regulations.

BMW P66/1 was proved less successful compared to previous P66 version that scored four wins, twelve pole positions and six fastest laps. BMW P66/1 was the last-ever BMW V8 naturally aspirated DTM engine to date.

Applications
BMW M4 DTM

BMW P66/3 (2022-present)

References

External links
BMW Motorsport DTM Division Official Website

P66 Series
P66 Series
Gasoline engines by model
Deutsche Tourenwagen Masters
V8 engines